Manastirica may refer to:

 Manastirica (Kladovo), a village in Serbia
 Manastirica (Petrovac), a village in Serbia